The International Commission for Railwaymen was an early international trade secretariat, bringing together trade unions representing railway workers.

The federation was established in 1893, at a meeting in Zurich.  It held further conferences in 1894 in Paris, and in 1895 in Milan.  In 1898, it merged into the International Federation of Ship, Dock and River Workers, which renamed itself as the International Transport Workers' Federation.

References

Global union federations
Railway labor unions
Trade unions established in 1893
Trade unions disestablished in the 1890s